Mark Strand (April 11, 1934 – November 29, 2014) was a Canadian-born American poet, essayist and translator. He was appointed Poet Laureate Consultant in Poetry to the Library of Congress in 1990 and received the Wallace Stevens Award in 2004. Strand was a professor of English and Comparative Literature at Columbia University from 2005 until his death in 2014.

Biography 
Strand was born in 1934 at Summerside, Prince Edward Island, Canada. Raised in a secular Jewish family, he spent his early years in North America and much of his adolescence in South and Central America. Strand graduated from Oakwood Friends School in 1951 and in 1957 earned his B.A. from Antioch College in Ohio. He then studied painting under Josef Albers at Yale University, where he earned a B.F.A in 1959. On a U.S.-Italy Fulbright Commission scholarship, Strand studied 19th-century Italian poetry in Florence in 1960–61. He attended the Iowa Writers' Workshop at the University of Iowa the following year and earned a Master of Arts in 1962. In 1965 he spent a year in Brazil as a Fulbright Lecturer.

In 1981, Strand was elected a member of The American Academy of Arts and Letters. He served as Poet Laureate Consultant in Poetry to the Library of Congress during the 1990–91 term. In 1997, he left Johns Hopkins University to accept the Andrew MacLeish Distinguished Service Professorship of Social Thought at the Committee on Social Thought at the University of Chicago. From 2005 to his death, Strand taught literature and creative writing at Columbia University, in New York City.

Strand received numerous awards, including a MacArthur Fellowship in 1987 and the 1999 Pulitzer Prize for Poetry, for Blizzard of One.

Strand died of liposarcoma on November 29, 2014, in Brooklyn, New York.

Poetry
Many of Strand's poems are nostalgic in tone, evoking the bays, fields, boats, and pines of his Prince Edward Island childhood. He has been compared to Robert Bly in his use of surrealism, though he attributes his poems' surreal elements to an admiration of the works of Max Ernst, Giorgio de Chirico, and René Magritte. Strand's poems use plain and concrete language, usually without rhyme or meter. In a 1971 interview, he said, "I feel very much a part of a new international style that has a lot to do with plainness of diction, a certain reliance on surrealist techniques, and a strong narrative element."

Academic career
Strand's academic career took him to various colleges and universities, including:

Teaching positions

 University of Iowa, Iowa City, instructor in English, 1962–1965
 University of Brazil, Rio de Janeiro, Fulbright lecturer, 1965–1966
 Mount Holyoke College, South Hadley, MA, assistant professor, 1967
 Columbia University, New York City, adjunct associate professor, 1969–1972
 Brooklyn College of the City University of New York, New York City, associate professor, 1970–1972
 Princeton University, Princeton, NJ, Bain-Swiggett Lecturer, 1973
 Brandeis University, Hurst professor of poetry, 1974–1975
 University of Utah, Salt Lake City, professor of English, 1981–1993
 Johns Hopkins University, Elliot Coleman Professor of Poetry, 1994–c. 1998
 University of Chicago, Committee on Social Thought, 1998 – ca. 2005
 Columbia University, New York City, professor of English and Comparative Literature, ca. 2005–2014

Visiting professor
 University of Washington, 1968, 1970
 Columbia University, 1980
 Yale University, 1969–1970
 University of Virginia, 1976, 1978
 California State University at Fresno, 1977
 University of California at Irvine, 1979
 Wesleyan University, 1979
 Harvard University, 1980

Awards 
Strand was awarded the following:
 1960–1961: Fulbright Fellowship
 1979: Fellowship of the Academy of American Poets
 1987: MacArthur Fellowship
 1990–1991: Poet Laureate Consultant in Poetry to the Library of Congress
 1992: Bobbitt National Prize for Poetry
 1993: Bollingen Prize
 1999: Pulitzer Prize, for Blizzard of One
 2004: Wallace Stevens Award
 2009: Gold Medal in Poetry, from the American Academy of Arts and Letters

Bibliography

Poetry 
 1964: Sleeping with One Eye Open, Stone Wall Press
 1968: Reasons for Moving: Poems, Atheneum
 1970: Darker: Poems, including "The New Poetry Handbook", Atheneum
 1973: The Story of Our Lives, Atheneum 
 1973: The Sargentville Notebook, Burning Deck
 1975: From Two Notebooks, No Mountains Poetry Project
 1976: My Son, No Mountains Poetry Project
 1978: Elegy for My Father, Windhover
 1978: The Late Hour, Atheneum
 1980: Selected Poems, including "Keeping Things Whole", Atheneum
 1990: The Continuous Life, Knopf 
 1990: New Poems
 1991: The Monument, Ecco Press (see also The Monument, 1978, prose)
 1993: Dark Harbor: A Poem, long poem divided into 55 sections, Knopf
 1998: Blizzard of One: Poems, Knopf winner of the 1999 Pulitzer Prize for poetry
 1999: Chicken, Shadow, Moon & More, with illustrations by the author, Turtle Point Press
 1999: "89 Clouds" a single poem, monotypes by Wendy Mark and introduction by Thomas Hoving, ACA Galleries (New York)
 2006: Man and Camel, Knopf 
 2007: New Selected Poems
 2012: Almost Invisible, Random House, 
2014: Collected Poems, Knopf

Prose 
 1978: The Monument, Ecco (see also The Monument, 1991, poetry) 
 1982: Contributor: Claims for Poetry, edited by Donald Hall, University of Michigan Press
 1982: The Planet of Lost Things, for children
 1983: The Art of the Real, art criticism, C. N. Potter
 1985: The Night Book, for children
 1985: Mr. and Mrs. Baby and Other Stories, short stories, Knopf 
 1986: Rembrandt Takes a Walk, for children
 1987: William Bailey, art criticism, Abrams
 1993: Contributor: Within This Garden: Photographs by Ruth Thorne-Thomsen, Columbia College Chicago/Aperture Foundation
 1994: Hopper, art criticism, Ecco Press 
 2000: The Weather of Words: Poetic Invention, Knopf
 2000: With Eavan Boland, The Making of a Poem: A Norton Anthology of Poetic Forms, Norton (New York)

Poetry translations 
 1971: 18 Poems from the Quechua, Halty Ferguson
 1973: The Owl's Insomnia, poems by Rafael Alberti, Atheneum
 1976: Souvenir of the Ancient World, poems by Carlos Drummond de Andrade, Antaeus Editions
 2002: Looking for Poetry: Poems by Carlos Drummond de Andrade and Rafael Alberti, with Songs from the Quechua
 1993: Contributor: "Canto IV", Dante's Inferno: Translations by Twenty Contemporary Poets edited by Daniel Halpern, Harper Perennial
 1986, according to one source, or 1987, according to another source: Traveling in the Family, poems by Carlos Drummond de Andrade, with Thomas Colchie; translator with Elizabeth Bishop, Colchie, and Gregory Rabassa)  Random House

Editor
 1968: The Contemporary American Poets, New American Library
 1970: New Poetry of Mexico, Dutton
 1976: Another Republic: Seventeen European and South American Writers, with Charles Simic, Ecco
 1991: The Best American Poetry 1991, Macmillan
 1994: Golden Ecco Anthology, Ecco Press
 1994: The Golden Ecco Anthology
 2005: 100 Great Poems of the Twentieth Century, W. W. Norton

References

External links 

1934 births
2014 deaths
American Poets Laureate
American male poets
Antioch College alumni
Bollingen Prize recipients
Columbia University faculty
Iowa Writers' Workshop alumni
Iowa Writers' Workshop faculty
Jewish American poets
MacArthur Fellows
Members of the American Academy of Arts and Letters
People from Summerside, Prince Edward Island
Poets from Utah
Pulitzer Prize for Poetry winners
Translators to English
University of Chicago faculty
University of Iowa alumni
Wesleyan University faculty
Writers from Prince Edward Island
Yale University alumni
Canadian emigrants to the United States
20th-century American poets
20th-century translators
20th-century American male writers
Brooklyn College faculty
Deaths from liposarcoma
Deaths from cancer in New York (state)
21st-century American Jews
Fulbright alumni